Mama Was a Rock and Roll Singer, Papa Used to Write All Her Songs is the fifth and final studio album by American pop duo Sonny & Cher, released in 1973 by MCA Records.  In 2018 it was released on CD.

Album information 
The album was released in 1973 and reached #132 on the Billboard album chart. The title track was the only single from the album to enter the US charts, reaching #77 (in a much shorter form) on the Billboard Hot 100.

The album is largely a collection of cover songs which include songs like "I Can See Clearly Now" (originally by Johnny Nash), "Brother Love's Traveling Salvation Show" (Neil Diamond), and "Listen to the Music" (The Doobie Brothers).

The only song written by Bono is the title track; it clocks in at over nine minutes on the album version, and was edited down to under four minutes for the single.

Track listing 
Side A
 "It Never Rains in Southern California" (Albert Hammond, Mike Hazlewood) – 3:49
 "I Believe in You"  (Dennis Pregnolato, Michel Rubini, Don Dunne) – 2:59
 "I Can See Clearly Now" (Johnny Nash) – 3:38
 "Rhythm of Your Heart Beat" (Tony Macaulay, Geoff Stephens) – 3:32
 "Mama Was a Rock and Roll Singer Papa Used to Write All Her Songs" (Sonny Bono) – 9:37

Side B
 "By Love I Mean" (Hal David, William Jacobs, M. A. Trujillo) – 4:24
 "Brother Love's Traveling Salvation Show"  (Neil Diamond) – 3:16
 "You Know Darn Well" (Tony Macaulay) – 3:20
 "The Greatest Show on Earth" (Bob Stone) – 3:50
 "Listen to the Music" (Tom Johnston) – 3:53

Charts

Credits

Personnel 
 Main vocals: Cher
 Main vocals: Sonny Bono

Production 
 Producer: Sonny Bono
 Producer: Denis Pregnolato 
 Producer: Michel Rubini

References 

1974 albums
Sonny & Cher albums
Albums produced by Sonny Bono
MCA Records albums